Réalt na Mara, Cromane, is a Gaelic Athletic Association club from the fishing village of Cromane, eight miles west of Killorglin in County Kerry, Ireland.

Cromane play football in maroon and white colours. The club fields teams from under-8 to senior level. The club's name is derived from the village's church, also called Réalt na Mara (Star of the Sea in English). The local national school also carries the same name.

There was a club in Cromane in the mid-1950s. Indeed, in 1954, Pat O'Shea played for the Kerry minors as a Cromane player.

Players
Since 1983 – when the current club was reformed – players such as 2015 GAA Football All-Star Donnchadh Walsh, Sean O'Sullivan, Patie Casey (1987 Kerry minor), Seán Walsh, and Deavan O'Flaherty have worn the green and gold of Kerry. 
In May 2019 Kieran O'Sullivan became the latest Cromane club man to play Kerry minor football when he lined out against Cork in Páirc Uí Rinn, Cork city.
Kieran continued to line out at corner-back in each of the Kerry minors' 2019 championship matches. Their season ended with a narrow 0-14 to 0-13 All-Ireland semi-final defeat to Galway in Croke Park.
In 2022, Liam O'Neill became the latest Cromane man to feature for the Kerry minor footballers. He was part of the panel that contested the Munster final against Cork in May 2022.

Donnchadh Walsh
Donnchadh Walsh played Kerry minor for two years (2001/02) as well as under-21 and went on to win three All-Ireland medals (2007, 2009, and 2014). In 2015 Donnchadh was named as left-half forward on the GAA Football All-Stars team.

Sean O'Sullivan
Seán O'Sullivan played Kerry minor in 1998 and then had three years as an under-21, losing the 1999 All-Ireland Under-21 Football final against Westmeath. Seán quickly progressed to the Kerry senior football team and played between 2002 and 2009 during which time he won four All-Irelands himself (2004, 2006, 2007, and 2009).

Seán Walsh, a brother of Donnchadh's, was a member of the Kerry under-21 football panel in 2010, while Deavan O'Flaherty was a member of the Kerry minor football panel in 2012.

On 2 March 2003, both Donnchadh Walsh and Seán O'Sullivan lined out in the half-forward line for the Kerry senior football team in their National League win (2–11 to 0–14) over Dublin in Killarney.

In November 2015 Donnchadh Walsh was the only Kerry player to be selected to play Australia in a one-off International Rules game in Croke Park.

Achievements
Cromane's first major triumph on the football field came in October 1994 when they claimed the Kerry Novice Championship beating Tuosist by 2-14 to 1-4 at Fitzgerald Stadium, Killarney. It was a feat they repeated in 1998 – again beating Tuosist in the final.

Cromane's first Mid Kerry title came in 1999 when they claimed the O'Sullivan Cup title, three more titles quickly followed in 2002, 2003, and 2006. In October 2018 Cromane claimed their fifth Mid Kerry O'Sullivan Cup win.

In March 2008 Cromane won the Munster Junior B Football Championship beating Cork's St Oliver Plunkett's in the final in Knockaderry, Limerick. The final score was Cromane 1–8, Oliver Plunkett's 0–8. Cromane claimed the honour of representing Kerry having won the 2007 Kerry Novice Championship (Kerry's version of Junior B) by beating Ballydonoghue in Austin Stack Park, Tralee. The final score was Cromane 0–11, Ballydonoghue 2–3.

The Cromane senior football team currently competes in Division 4 of the Kerry County League.

In October 2017, they won their fourth Kerry County Novice Championship title when they beat Moyvane by 1–12 to 0–12. The game was played at Strand Road in Tralee. This win meant that Cromane represented Kerry in the 2017 Munster Junior B Championship.

Cromane played The Banner GAA Club, from Ennis, Co. Clare, in the 2017 Munster Junior B Football Championship quarter-final in Knockaderry, Co. Limerick. The game was played on 20 November 2017, with Cromane winning 0–10 to 0–5. This victory set up a semi-final meeting with Tipperary champions Cashel King Cormacs. The semi-final was delayed due to adverse weather conditions until Sunday, 4 February 2018. Cromane came out on top in a high-scoring semi-final, winning 2–14 to 4–3 against Cashel King Cormacs to set up a Munster Junior B Football Championship final against the Limerick champions Ballybrown. Cromane lost the final by 0–11 to 1–10.

In February 2019, Cromane competed in Comórtas Peile Páidi Ó Sé tournament winning the junior final against Renard by 3–8 to 1–8. The Cromane captain John Michael Foley received the Páidi Ó Sé Memorial Perpetual Cup.

In October 2021, Cromane claimed their fifth county title when they defeated Asdee in the Covid-delayed 2020 Novice County Championship final. The final score from the final played in Ballymac was Cromane 3-9, Asdee 0-8.

Teams

Famous players
Sean O'Sullivan
Donnchadh Walsh

All-Ireland Senior Football Championship

Sean O'Sullivan (2): 2006, 2007
Donnchadh Walsh (2): 2009, 2014

References

External links
Cromane GAA on Facebook
Cromane GAA on Twitter
Cromane GAA on Instagram

Gaelic games clubs in County Kerry
Gaelic football clubs in County Kerry